Motilal Roy (January 5, 1883 — April 10, 1959) was a Bengali revolutionary, journalist, social reformer. He founded the Prabartak Sangha, a nationalist organisation for social works.

Early life 

Motilal Roy was born at Borai Chanditala, Chandannagore, Hooghly district in British India. His father was Biharilal Singha Roy. Their family was  originated from Chettri Rajput of Uttar Pradesh. Roy completed his schooling from Free Church Institution. After the sad demise of his only girl child, Roy attracted to Vaishnavism and in 1920 he organised a group to serve the poor people.

Activities 
Motilal joined in the movement against Partition of Bengal (1905) in 1905. Latter he was attached with armed revolutionaries of Bengal. He collected that revolver and supplied to Kanailal Dutta by Shrish Chandra Ghosh for the assassination of Naren Goswami in 1908. Roy established the Prabartak Sangha under the inspiration of Sri Aurobindo. Roy's home as well as the Sangha were the important safe house of Indian freedom fighters. Hundreds of Indian independence activists took shelter in Roy's house. Being a senior member of the revolutionary group he provided money and arms to the revolutionaries. in 21 February, 1910 Aurobindo reached at Chandannagar and stayed in Roy's house for 42 days safely before going Pondicherry. Roy assumed the title of Sangha Guru or the chief spiritual leader of the organization. He also established school, library, students hostel publication house and Khadi business for people. A fortnightly journal of his organisation named Prabartak was edited by another senior revolutionary Manindra Nath Nayak.

References 

1883 births
1959 deaths
Revolutionaries of Bengal during British Rule
20th-century Hindu religious leaders
Bengali Hindus
Hindu reformers
Swadeshi activists
Indian independence movement
Revolutionary movement for Indian independence
Indian independence activists from West Bengal